This is a list of the records issued by UK band Lindisfarne.

Albums

Live albums

Compilations

Finest Hour (1975) - No. 55 in October 1975.
Lady Eleanor (1977) - Budget compilation on Pickwick Records.
Repeat Performance (1981)
The Best of Lindisfarne (1989) - 16 track compilation from Lindisfarne Mk I.
Buried Treasures Vol. I (1992) - Compilation of previously unreleased material.
Buried Treasures Vol. II (1992) - Included some previously unreleased material.
Lindisfarne On Tap (1994) - Castle Communications: 18 track compilation 1970–1993.
The Other Side Of (1996) - Mooncrest: 6 "classic" songs and 8 covers from the "C'Mon Everybody" album
Lindisfarne (1997) - Rialto Archive Series: 6 "classic" songs and 12 covers from the "C'Mon Everybody" album
Lady Eleanor (1997) - Recall: 2CD (36 tracks) compilation spanning 1978–1994. 
Run for Home (1997) - Music Club: 19 tracks from the 1978–1993 period.
Anthology: Road to Kingdom Come (2000) - Castle Music: 2CD (35 tracks) from the 1978–1993 period.
Magic in the Air/Caught in the Act (2000) - Castle Music: 2CD compilation of "Magic in the Air" and the 2 Lindisfarntastic Albums.
Run For Home (2000) Castle Pie: 16 track compilation 1978–1993.
BT3 (2000) Included some previously unreleased material.
Back on the Tyne (2002) - Eagle Records: 2CD (23 track) compilation.
The Very Best of Lindisfarne (2003) - 20 tracks from the original 3 albums and mini biography by Ray Laidlaw. Features 2 previously unreleased tracks ("Sleeping" and "Love in a Cage")
The Best of Lindisfarne (2005) - Virgin Charisma: 19 tracks from studio albums up to "Promenade".
Meet me on the Corner: The Collection (2006)
The Charisma Years 1970–1973 (4 CD Box set) - featuring their five Charisma albums Nicely out of tune, Fog on the Tyne, Dingly Dell, Lindisfarne Live and Roll On Ruby; with several bonus tracks (singles A and B sides, etc.)

Singles

References

External links
 Lindisfarne discography at Discogs

Discographies of British artists
Rock music group discographies